Mala, or Pay, is a Papuan language of Madang Province, Papua New Guinea.

References

Kaukombaran languages
Languages of Papua New Guinea